Clifty Township is one of twelve townships in Bartholomew County, Indiana, United States. As of the 2010 census, its population was 1,004 and it contained 400 housing units.

Geography

Unincorporated towns
 Newbern
(This list is based on USGS data and may include former settlements.)

Adjacent townships
 Haw Creek Township (north)
 Clay Township, Decatur County (northeast)
 Jackson Township, Decatur County (east)
 Rock Creek Township (south)
 Clay Township (west)

Cemeteries
The township contains these two cemeteries: Little Sand Creek and Mount Pleasant.

Major highways
  Indiana State Road 46

School districts
 Bartholomew County School Corporation

Political districts
 Indiana's 6th congressional district
 State House District 57
 State Senate District 41

References
 United States Census Bureau 2007 TIGER/Line Shapefiles
 United States Board on Geographic Names (GNIS)
 United States National Atlas

External links
 Indiana Township Association
 United Township Association of Indiana

Townships in Bartholomew County, Indiana
Townships in Indiana